This is a list of racing drivers to have raced in the European Touring Car Cup (2005–2017).

Drivers

drivers
Lists of auto racing people